Dennis Virkler (November 23, 1941 – September 15, 2022) was an American film editor with more than 40 credits dating from 1973. He was nominated twice for the Academy Award for Best Film Editing, and was elected as a member of the American Cinema Editors. The Fugitive (1993) was listed as the 39th best-edited film of all time in a 2012 survey of members of the Motion Picture Editors Guild. Virkler died from heart failure on September 15, 2022. He was 80.

Filmography (selected)
Necromancy (1972)
Chosen Survivors (1974)
Burnt Offerings (1976)
The Bad News Bears Go to Japan (1978)
Xanadu (1980)
Continental Divide (1981)
Sharky's Machine (1981)
Airplane II: The Sequel (1982)
Independence Day (1983)
Gorky Park (1983)
The River Rat (1984)
Secret Admirer (1985)
Miracles (1986)
Nobody's Fool (1986)
Big Shots (1987)
Distant Thunder (1988)
The Favorite (1989)
The Hunt for Red October (1990), nominated for Academy Award
Freejack (1992)
Falling from Grace (1992)
Under Siege (1992)
The Fugitive (1993), nominated for Academy Award, BAFTA, and ACE Eddie
Only the Strong (1993)
Batman Forever (1995)
The Devil's Own (1997)
Batman & Robin (1997)
A Perfect Murder (1998)
The 13th Warrior (1999)
The Adventures of Rocky and Bullwinkle (2000)
Collateral Damage (2002)
Swimfan (2002)
Daredevil (2003)
The Chronicles of Riddick (2004)
Into the Blue (2005)
The Fog (2005)
The Guardian (2006)
Halloween (2007)
Bangkok Dangerous (2008)
A Fork in the Road (2009)
Outrage (2009)
The Wolfman (2010)
Shark Night (2011)
August Eighth (2012)
Angels in Stardust (2014)
The Ottoman Lieutenant (2017)

References

External links 
 

1941 births
2022 deaths
American Cinema Editors
American film editors
People from Cleveland